Somerville is a census-designated place (CDP) and former village in Milford Township, Butler County, Ohio, United States. The population was 281 at the 2010 census.

Geography
Somerville is located at  (39.562003, -84.637949).

History
Somerville was incorporated as a village in 1832. On March 15, 2016, Somerville residents voted 52% to 48% to dissolve the village into Milford Township, after its entire council faced term limits or resigned.

Since dissolution of the village, Milford Twp. Has assumed the majority of public services. Milford Twp. Department of Public Works based out of nearby Collinsville provides a majority of these public services. The Milford Twp. Fire Department took control and operations of the Somerville Fire Department Station 191 and has folded it into the department, operating it as Station 163. EMS service is provided by Seven Mile Fire Department and Life Squad based out of Station 171 along with most of east Milford Twp. Butler County Sheriff's Office provides law enforcement to the community.

Demographics

2010 census
As of the census of 2010, there were 281 people, 96 households, and 74 families living in the village. The racial makeup of the village was 98.2% White and 1.8% from two or more races.

There were 96 households, of which 34.4% had children under the age of 18 living with them, 58.3% were married couples living together, 10.4% had a female householder with no husband present, 8.3% had a male householder with no wife present, and 22.9% were non-families. 19.8% of all households were made up of individuals, and 4.1% had someone living alone who was 65 years of age or older. The average household size was 2.93 and the average family size was 3.34.

The median age in the village was 37.8 years. 24.9% of residents were under the age of 18; 8.1% were between the ages of 18 and 24; 23.1% were from 25 to 44; 31.2% were from 45 to 64; and 12.5% were 65 years of age or older. The gender makeup of the village was 53.0% male and 47.0% female.

2000 census
As of the census of 2000, there were 294 people, 106 households, and 85 families living in the village. The population density was 1,014.4 people per square mile (391.4/km). There were 110 housing units at an average density of 379.5 per square mile (146.5/km). The racial makeup of the village was 99.66% White, and 0.34% Asian.

There were 106 households, out of which 33.0% had children under the age of 18 living with them, 62.3% were married couples living together, 13.2% had a female householder with no husband present, and 18.9% were non-families. 16.0% of all households were made up of individuals, and 9.4% had someone living alone who was 65 years of age or older. The average household size was 2.77 and the average family size was 2.99.

In the village the population was spread out, with 26.5% under the age of 18, 7.5% from 18 to 24, 28.2% from 25 to 44, 24.5% from 45 to 64, and 13.3% who were 65 years of age or older. The median age was 35 years. For every 100 females, there were 101.4 males. For every 100 females age 18 and over, there were 92.9 males.

The median income for a household in the village was $32,857, and the median income for a family was $34,583. Males had a median income of $34,167 versus $18,594 for females. The per capita income for the village was $13,892. About 5.9% of families and 10.3% of the population were below the poverty line, including 10.2% of those under the age of eighteen and 5.3% of those 65 or over.

References

Further reading
 Bert S. Barlow, W.H. Todhunter, Stephen D. Cone, Joseph J. Pater, and Frederick Schneider, eds. Centennial History of Butler County, Ohio. Hamilton, Ohio: B.F. Bowen, 1905.
 Jim Blount. The 1900s: 100 Years In the History of Butler County, Ohio. Hamilton, Ohio: Past Present Press, 2000.
 Butler County Engineer's Office. Butler County Official Transportation Map, 2003. Fairfield Township, Butler County, Ohio: The Office, 2003.
 A History and Biographical Cyclopaedia of Butler County, Ohio with Illustrations and Sketches of Its Representative Men and Pioneers. Cincinnati, Ohio: Western Biographical Publishing Company, 1882. 
 Ohio. Secretary of State. The Ohio municipal and township roster, 2002-2003. Columbus, Ohio: The Secretary, 2003.

Unincorporated communities in Butler County, Ohio
1832 establishments in Ohio
Populated places established in 1832
Populated places disestablished in 2016
Former villages in Ohio
2016 disestablishments in Ohio
Unincorporated communities in Ohio